Vanderpump Rules is an American reality television series which has been broadcast on Bravo since January 7, 2013. Developed as the first spin-off from The Real Housewives of Beverly Hills, it has aired nine seasons and focuses on Lisa Vanderpump and the staff at her restaurants and bars; SUR Restaurant & Lounge, Pump Restaurant and Tom Tom Restaurant & Bar, in West Hollywood, California.

Series overview

Episodes

Season 1 (2013) 
 
Lisa Vanderpump from The Real Housewives of Beverly Hills stars. Kristen Doute, Katie Maloney, Tom Sandoval, Stassi Schroeder, Scheana and Jax Taylor are introduced as series regulars.

Season 2 (2013–14)

Season 3 (2014–15)
Ariana Madix and Tom Schwartz are promoted to series regulars.

Season 4 (2015–16)
James Kennedy is promoted to series regular.

Season 5 (2016–17)
Stassi Schroeder returns as a series regular.

Season 6 (2017–18)
Brittany Cartwright and Lala Kent are promoted to series regulars.

Season 7 (2018–19)

Season 8 (2020)
Beau Clark is promoted to a series regular. Max Boyens, Brett Caprioni and Dayna Kathan are introduced as series regulars.

Season 9 (2021–22)
Doute, Schroeder, Taylor, Cartwright, Boyens, Caprioni, Clark and Kathan departed as series regulars. Charli Burnett and Raquel Leviss are promoted to series regulars. Brock Davies is introduced as a series regular.

Season 10 (2023) 
Burnett and Davies departed as a series regular, whilst Burnett served in a recurring capacity. Kristina Kelly and Ally Lewber served in recurring capacities.

References

External links

Lists of American non-fiction television series episodes
Lists of American reality television series episodes
The Real Housewives spin-offs